Trams in Hong Kong include the Hong Kong Tramways, the Peak Tram (a funicular railway which is always referred to as a tram) and the Light Rail Transit (MTR Light Rail, LRT; formerly KCR Light Rail).

History 

A bill, the Tramways Bill 1881, was introduced in the legislature of the colony in 1881, with the motion for its first reading moved by Francis Bulkeley Johnson and seconded by Ng Choy. It called for the construction along the northern shore of the city and to the peak  a tramway "to be moved by animal, steam or any mechanical power, for the carriage of passengers, their belongings, whether luggage, goods or passengers' animals, provided that they did not exceed 16 lb. in weight or one cubic  foot in volume". One of the six proposed lines, "tramway no. 6", was built as the Peak Tram, along with the Peak Tram Regulations made by the  Governor in Council under the Tramways Ordinance 1883 on 16 December 1889. The other five lines become the model for the 1904 tramways, although not following exactly the same route, with another, separate ordinance, the Hongkong Tramway Ordinance 1902.

The systems

Peak Tram 

The Peak Tram, opened in 1888, is a funicular railway.

Hong Kong Tramways 
Hong Kong has had a tramway system since 1904: the Hong Kong Tramways. It is a traditional British Isles-style double-decker tramway with street running, along the north shore of Hong Kong Island.

MTR Light Rail 
Since 1988, the MTR Light Rail system (then called Light Rail Transit (LRT); part of the KCR network and operated by the KCR Corporation until 2008) has opened in the northwest New Territories.

Track gauge and voltage 
 Peak Tram:  five-foot gauge, n/a (funicular)
 Hong Kong Tramways: , 550 V DC (overhead line, collected by a single trolley pole)
 MTR Light Rail: ,  (overhead line)

Services 
 Peak Tram: One single line (1888)
 Hong Kong Tramways (1904):
 Shau Kei Wan <--> Western Market
 Shau Kei Wan <--> Happy Valley
 North Point <--> Witty Street
 Causeway Bay <--> Witty Street
 Happy Valley <--> Kennedy Town
 Shau Kei Wan <--> Kennedy Town
 Western Market <--> Kennedy Town
 Causeway Bay <--> Kennedy Town
 Light Rail
 5xx (1988)
 6xx (1988)
 7xx (1993)

See also

References 

 
Hong Kong